Akshatau (also known as Aqshatau (Aqşatau, اقشاتاۋ; , Akshatau)) is a town in Aktobe Region, west Kazakhstan. Rare metal deposits can be found near Akshatau.

References

Aktobe Region
Cities and towns in Kazakhstan